Arun Kumar Sharma (born 21 April 1958) is an Indian former first-class cricketer who played for Punjab. He worked as a cricket coach, selector and administrator after his playing career.

Career
A wicket-keeper, Sharma made his first-class debut at the age of 20 for India Under-22s against the touring West Indies team in November 1978. He played for Punjab in the Ranji Trophy for the first time the following month, starting a 16-season run as the team's first-choice wicket-keeper. He was part of the Punjab team that lifted the 1992–93 Ranji Trophy, effecting seven dismissals in the final against Maharashtra. Sharma appeared in a total of 73 first-class matches and effected over 200 dismissals.

Sharma continued to be associated with the sport after his playing career. He worked as a selector for the India under-19 team. He also worked as the head coach of the Punjab senior side for several years until the appointment of Ajay Ratra in 2017 for that position. In 2017, the Punjab Cricket Association selected Sharma as its joint secretary.

References

External links
 
 

1958 births
Living people
Indian cricketers
Punjab, India cricketers
North Zone cricketers
Cricketers from Amritsar
Indian cricket coaches